Kristina Pronzhenko (Cyrillic: Кристина Пронженко; born 10 December 1988 in Mastchoh) is a Tajikistani athlete who competes primarily in the combined events. She competed in the 200 metres at the 2015 World Championships in Beijing without qualifying for the semifinals.

Her brother Aleksandr Pronzhenko is also an athlete.

Competition record

References

External links

1988 births
Living people
Tajikistani female sprinters
Tajikistani heptathletes
People from Sughd Region
Tajikistani people of Russian descent
Athletes (track and field) at the 2014 Asian Games
Athletes (track and field) at the 2018 Asian Games
World Athletics Championships athletes for Tajikistan
Olympic athletes of Tajikistan
Athletes (track and field) at the 2016 Summer Olympics
Asian Games competitors for Tajikistan
Olympic female sprinters